Nakhon Mae Sot United Football Club (Thai นครแม่สอด ยูไนเต็ด), is a Thai football club based in Mae Sot in Tak, Thailand. The club is currently playing in the Thai League 3.

Record

P = Played
W = Games won
D = Games drawn
L = Games lost
F = Goals for
A = Goals against
Pts = Points
Pos = Final position

QR1 = First Qualifying Round
QR2 = Second Qualifying Round
R1 = Round 1
R2 = Round 2
R3 = Round 3
R4 = Round 4

R5 = Round 5
R6 = Round 6
QF = Quarter-finals
SF = Semi-finals
RU = Runners-up
W = Winners

Players

Current squad

Club officials

References

 http://www.supersubthailand.com/news/13526-33/index.html#sthash.mPzeUliO.dpbs
 http://www.77jowo.com/contents/2689
 https://www.youtube.com/watch?v=3IkXkRLaMSY
 https://www.youtube.com/watch?v=T-3p4w2KIw0
 https://www.dailynews.co.th/tags/%E0%B8%99%E0%B8%84%E0%B8%A3%E0%B9%81%E0%B8%A1%E0%B9%88%E0%B8%AA%E0%B8%AD%E0%B8%94%20%E0%B8%A2%E0%B8%B9%E0%B9%84%E0%B8%99%E0%B9%80%E0%B8%95%E0%B9%87%E0%B8%94

External links
 

Association football clubs established in 2016
Football clubs in Thailand
Sport in Tak province
2016 establishments in Thailand